VICS or Vics may stand for:

 Variable Inertia Charging System, a variant of variable length intake manifold
 Vehicle Information and Communication System
 Northwich Victoria F.C., nicknamed "The Vics"

See also
VIC (disambiguation)